Modeste M'bami (9 October 1982 – 7 January 2023) was a Cameroonian professional footballer who played as a midfielder. M'bami played for clubs in France, Saudi Arabia, and Cameroon, most notably Paris Saint-Germain and Marseille, both of which in Ligue 1.

Club career

Born in Yaoundé, M'bami started his career in his home country playing for Dynamo Douala but was quickly spotted by foreign clubs.

M'bami joined Sedan during the summer of 2000. Despite his young age, M'bami played ten matches in his first season in the Division 1 and helped his club to finish fifth. He rapidly became a team regular and played 60 matches in the two following seasons. In 2003, the club was relegated to Ligue 2 and M'Bami decided to sign a five-year contract with Paris Saint-Germain for €5 million after his agent Willie McKay halted advanced discussions with Wolverhampton Wanderers.

During his first season with Paris Saint-Germain, M'bami was associated with another young defensive midfielder, Lorik Cana. Despite their lack of experience, they played a big part in the club's good season, where Paris Saint-Germain finished second in Ligue 1 and won the Coupe de France. The club's 2004–05 season was less successful, in which M'bami was struggling with an injury. The 2005–06 season saw M'Bami help Paris Saint-Germain to another Coupe de France title, while the club finished 9th in the league.

In August 2006, after three years at Paris Saint-Germain, M'Bami was transferred to arch-rivals Marseille, signing a three-year contract, and thus renewing his midfield partnership with Lorik Cana, who had signed for Marseille the season before.

M'bami left Marseille after his contract expired in summer 2009 and has since had trials at English Premier League clubs Portsmouth, Bolton Wanderers, Wolverhampton Wanderers and Wigan Athletic. After his contract ended with Marseille he moved on 30 September 2009 for a trial with the Spanish club UD Almería, later Almería completed the purchase of the midfielder, the Cameroon player signed a contract with the Spanish club.

In July 2011, M'bami and Juanito were released by Almería. Then he joined China League One club Dalian Aerbin and was loaned to Chinese Super League side Changchun Yatai immediately. M'bami returned to Dalian Aerbin in 2012. However, he could not play for Dalian Aerbin in the 2012 league season due to the foreign players restricted rule. M'bami transferred to Saudi Premier League side Al-Ittihad in July 2012.

In 2014 he moved to Colombia joining Millonarios, from the capital city Bogotá. M'bami was hired to play as a defensive midfielder and signed a contract for the 2014–15 season.

International career
M'bami won the Olympic football games with his country in 2000 in Sydney, also scoring the golden goal against Brazil during the quarter-finals. He was also in the team when Cameroon reached the finals of the FIFA Confederations Cup in 2003 and was part of the 2004 African Cup of Nations team which finished top of its group in the first round of competition, before failing to secure qualification for the semi-finals.

M'bami was also in the Cameroon national team that failed to qualify for the 2006 FIFA World Cup as it finished second in its qualification group behind the Ivory Coast.

Coaching career

In November 2019 he turned down a coaching job with the Cameroon national team.

Death 
On 7 January 2023, Paris Saint-Germain announced that M'bami had died of a heart attack, at the age of 40.

Career statistics
Scores and results list Cameroon's goal tally first, score column indicates score after each M'bami goal.

Honours
Paris Saint-Germain
 Coupe de France: 2004, 2006

Ittihad FC
Kings Cup (Saudi Arabia): 2013

Cameroon
 Olympic Games: 2000
 Confederations Cup: runner-up 2003

References

External links
 
 Career stats 
 ESPN profile

1982 births
2023 deaths
Footballers from Yaoundé
Cameroonian footballers
Association football midfielders
Cameroon international footballers
Cameroon under-20 international footballers
Footballers at the 2000 Summer Olympics
2003 FIFA Confederations Cup players
Olympic footballers of Cameroon
Olympic medalists in football
Medalists at the 2000 Summer Olympics
Olympic gold medalists for Cameroon
Ligue 1 players
Ligue 2 players
La Liga players
Chinese Super League players
Saudi Professional League players
Categoría Primera A players
CS Sedan Ardennes players
Paris Saint-Germain F.C. players
Olympique de Marseille players
UD Almería players
Dalian Professional F.C. players
Changchun Yatai F.C. players
Ittihad FC players
Millonarios F.C. players
Cameroonian expatriate footballers
Cameroonian expatriate sportspeople in France
Expatriate footballers in France
Cameroonian expatriate sportspeople in Spain
Expatriate footballers in Spain
Cameroonian expatriate sportspeople in China
Expatriate footballers in China
Cameroonian expatriate sportspeople in Saudi Arabia
Expatriate footballers in Saudi Arabia
Cameroonian expatriate sportspeople in Colombia
Expatriate footballers in Colombia